Maben High School was a public secondary school located in Maben, Mississippi. Until 1970, it was a school for black children only; white children were bused  to the white Sturgis High School. It was a part of the Oktibbeha County School District, and was later merged with Sturgis High School to form West Oktibbeha County High School

In 2015 the schools of Oktibbeha County district consolidated into the Starkville Oktibbeha Consolidated School District, and this school consolidated into Starkville High School. As of 2016, the site was abandoned.

In 1966, Maben won the Mississippi state high school baseball championship.

Notable people
Donald Lee, NFL football player

References

External links
 
 
 

Schools in Oktibbeha County, Mississippi
Public high schools in Mississippi
2015 disestablishments in Mississippi
Educational institutions disestablished in 2015
Defunct schools in Mississippi
Education in Oktibbeha County, Mississippi